The Enduring Stockpile is the United States' arsenal of nuclear weapons following the end of the Cold War.

During the Cold War the United States produced over 70,000 nuclear weapons. By its end, the U.S. stockpile was about 23,000 weapons of 26 different types. The production of nuclear weapons ended in 1989, and since then existing weapons have been retired, dismantled, or mothballed. , the Enduring Stockpile consisted of about 9,600 weapons of 10 types. , about 3,000 of those weapons had been moved to the lowest readiness level, in which they are not dismantled, but are no longer in active service. In 2021, the Department of Energy website stated the stockpile was the lowest it had been since 1960.

Weapons in the Enduring Stockpile are categorized by level of readiness. The three levels are:

 Active Service: fully operational, connected to a delivery system, and available for immediate use (e.g., ICBM silos and ballistic missile submarines)
 Hedge Stockpile: fully operational, but kept in storage; available within minutes or hours; not connected to delivery systems, but delivery systems are available (e.g., missile and bomb stockpiles kept at various Air Force bases)
 Inactive Reserve: not in operational condition and/or do not have immediately available delivery systems, but can be made ready if needed.

In 2004, the stockpile included 5,886 strategic warheads and 1,120 tactical weapons. The strategic weapons included 1,490 ICBM warheads, 2,736 submarine-launched ballistic missile warheads, 1,660 bomber weapons such as strategic B61 and B83 gravity bombs, AGM-86 ALCM and several hundred spare warheads. The tactical weapons consist of 800 tactical B61 gravity bombs and 320 nuclear warheads for Tomahawk missiles.

The START II Treaty called for a reduction to a total of 3,500 to 3,000 warheads, but was not ratified by the Russian  Duma. The replacement 2002 Strategic Offensive Reductions Treaty delayed reductions to 2012, with a limit of 2,200 operationally deployed warheads. The New START treaty signed in 2010 commits to lowering that limit to 1,550 warheads, and was ratified by the Russian Duma on 26 January 2011.

See also
 Stockpile stewardship
 Nuclear weapons and the United States
 Reliable Replacement Warhead
 Stockpile
 Fogbank

References

External links
Nuclear Weapon Archive article on Enduring Stockpile
Estimated Strategic Nuclear Weapons Inventories (September 2004) 

Nuclear weapons of the United States